Wancho script is an alphabet created between 2001 and 2012 by middle school teacher Banwang Losu in Longding district, Arunachal Pradesh for writing the Wancho language.  Letters represent consonants and vowels.
Conjunct consonants are not used.
Tone is indicated with diacritical marks on vowel letters.

While Wancho script is taught in some schools, the Wancho language is generally written in either Devanagari script or the Latin alphabet.

Unicode

Wancho script was added to the Unicode Standard in March 2019 on version 12.0.

The Unicode block for Wancho is U+1E2C0–U+1E2FF:

References 

Alphabets
2001 introductions
Wancho language